
Year 546 (DXLVI) was a common year starting on Monday (link will display the full calendar) of the Julian calendar. The denomination 546 for this year has been used since the early medieval period, when the Anno Domini calendar era became the prevalent method in Europe for naming years.

Events 
 By place 
 Byzantine Empire 
 December 17 – Sack of Rome: After almost a year's siege, the capture of a grain fleet sent by the exiled Pope Vigilius near the mouth of the Tiber, and failure of troops of the Byzantine Empire under Belisarius to relieve the city, the Ostrogoths under King Totila plunder Rome and destroy its fortifications. He then withdraws to Apulia (Southern Italy).
 Winter – Pope Vigilius arrives in Constantinople, to meet with Emperor Justinian I. The future Pope Pelagius is sent by Totila to negotiate with Justinian.

 Europe 
 Audoin murders and succeeds Walthari as king of the Lombards. 
 Audoin receives subsidies from Justinian I, to encourage him to battle the Gepids in the Carpathian Mountains.
 Audoin leads the Lombards across the Danube into Pannonia, and becomes an ally of the Byzantines.

 Central America 
May 5 – After a victory by Calakmul during the First Tikal-Calakmul War, Aj Wosal Chan K'inich is installed as the new ruler of the Mayan city state of Naranjo in Guatemala and reigns until his death in 615.

 By topic 
 Religion 
 The Basilica of San Vitale (Ravenna) is completed by bishop Maximianus, during the Byzantine Exarchate of Ravenna. 
 Approximate date – The Diocese of Bangor is established in the Welsh kingdom of Gwynedd, with Deiniol consecrated as first bishop.

Births

Deaths 
 Walthari, king of the Lombards

References